The 2001 Leather Center Grand Prix of Texas was the opening round of the 2001 American Le Mans Series season.  It took place at Texas Motor Speedway, Texas, on March 4, 2001.

This event is the only time in the history of the American Le Mans Series that the 12 Hours of Sebring was not the first race on the schedule.  This race was also the last time the American Le Mans Series ran on a roval − a combined oval track and road course.

Official results
Class winners in bold.

Statistics
 Pole Position - #1 Audi Sport North America - 1:48.029
 Fastest Lap - #1 Audi Sport North America - 1:48.418
 Distance - 2060.282 km
 Average Speed - 171.406 km/h

External links
 
 World Sports Racing Prototypes - Race Results

T
Grand Prix of Texas
Grand Prix